Bárbara María Hueva (1733–1772) was a Spanish painter.

Life and work
Bárbara María Hueva was born in 1733 in Madrid. At the age of 19, in 1752, she was elected to the Real Academia de Bellas Artes de San Fernando at its first meeting. She was the first woman to obtain admittance and earned the first diploma from the academy.

References

1733 births
1772 deaths
18th-century Spanish painters
Artists from Madrid
Spanish women artists